Tacu Maria (born February 15, 1949, in Burdusaci, Bacău County, d. June 18, 2010, Bucharest) was a Romanian poet and prose writer. She graduated from the Alexandru Ioan Cuza University in Iași, with a degree in Literature. She also published under the pen name Maria Constantines.

Her debut was in the Astra magazine (1987) while her first published work was The Hierarchy of Light (Prize of the "Writers Association" from Iași) a volume of poetry (1993). She published her first novel, My Aunt, Anestina in 2000. The main themes of love, loneliness, death and femininity, are found in subsequent novels. In 2005, Yesterday's Word (Vorba de Ieri), a novel about temptation and power is published. In 2008, Women under a Red Tree, another novel about the relationships of art, love and death is published. Her last novel, "Vlad and Katharina" about Vlad the Impaler was published posthumously in 2011.

Published works
The Hierarchy of Light, Danart, 1993
My Aunt, Anestina, Cartea Românească, 2000
Yesterday's Word, Cartea Românească, 2005
Women under a Red Tree, Polirom, 2008
Vlad and Katharina, Tracus Arte, 2011

References
Tacu, Maria (Biographical sketch) on the site of the "Cartea Românească" Editing House
Iulia Dondorici, PROZA. Maria TACU, Mătușa mea, Anestina, Observator Cultural, Nr. 38, noiembrie 2000
Costi Rogozanu, Lecturi la zi: Bold-uri, italice..., România Literară, Nr. 42, 2000
Adriana Stan, Romanul cu ilic, Tribuna, nr. 138, 1-15 iunie 2008
Horia Gârbea, Radu ALDULESCU - Interviu pentru ocuparea unui post de scriitor, Ramuri, Nr. 5-6, 2008

1949 births
2010 deaths
Romanian women poets
Romanian writers
20th-century Romanian poets
20th-century Romanian women writers
Alexandru Ioan Cuza University alumni
Pseudonymous women writers
People from Bacău County
20th-century pseudonymous writers